North Texas Soccer Club is a professional soccer club playing in the MLS Next Pro, a third division league of American soccer. The team is owned by, and operates as the reserve team of the Major League Soccer club FC Dallas. While the senior club is based, and plays, in Frisco, Texas, North Texas SC as of 2020 is based in Arlington, Texas, 38 miles / 70km south of Toyota Stadium Frisco, at Choctaw Stadium. The team was announced as a founder member of League One on November 2, 2018.

History 
On November 2, 2018, it was announced by FC Dallas that Dallas would be granted a side to play in the newly created United Soccer League third division for 2019. The club then officially announced the name of the reserve side, North Texas SC, and crest on December 6, 2018. In the team's first season, and despite playing mostly youth players from FC Dallas, North Texas SC won the USL League One championship, having already won the inaugural regular season title. Moreover, the team announced in October that they would be moving from Toyota Stadium, where FC Dallas plays their games, to Choctaw Stadium in Arlington, Texas for the 2020 USL League One Season, where they will share the newly modified stadium with XFL team the Dallas Renegades and Dallas Jackals of the MLR.

MLS Next Pro
The club announced on December 6, 2021, that it was joining the inaugural 21-team MLS Next Pro season starting in 2022.

Players and staff

Current roster

Staff

Statistics and records

Season-by-season

Head coaches record

Average attendance

Honors
 USL League One Championship
Winners: 2019
USL League One Regular Season Title
Winners: 2019

Player honors

See also 

 USL League One

References

External links 

 

 
Soccer clubs in Texas
Association football clubs established in 2018
2018 establishments in Texas
MLS Next Pro teams
Former USL League One teams
Reserve soccer teams in the United States
Soccer clubs in Dallas
Sports in Frisco, Texas